Several naval ships of Germany were named Danzig after the city of Danzig, modern-day Gdansk, Poland.

 : gunboat
 : corvette
  (1905):  3,300 ton  light cruiser

See also

 

German Navy ship names